Porter (\p(o)-rter\) is an English surname and also a given name. The name originates as an Old French occupational name, portier (gatekeeper), or porteour ("to carry"). Its earliest public record is 1086 at Winchester Castle. With transferred use, Porter also became a masculine given name with varied popularity. According to the U.S. Social Security Administration, Porter ranked #433 in 1907, declined to #1002 in 1944, and then rebounded to #476 in 2006.

Surname
People with the name include:

A – F
 Adriana Porter (1857–1946), Canadian poet and alleged witch
 Albert G. Porter (1824–1897), US congressman from Indiana
 Alexander Porter (1785–1844), US senator from Louisiana
 Alice Hobbins Porter (1854-1926), British-born US journalist, editor
 Alisan Porter (born 1981), retired actress, singer-songwriter, and winner of NBC's The Voice season 10
 Andrew Porter (Civil War general) (1820–1872), Union general in the American Civil War
 Andrew Porter (Revolutionary War officer) (1743–1813), American officer in the Revolutionary War
 Andy Porter (footballer, born 1968), English footballer
 Anna Porter, Canadian publisher and novelist
 Anna Maria Porter (1780–1832), English poet and novelist
 Augustus Seymour Porter (1798–1872), US senator from Michigan
 Austin Porter (born 1997), American singer from boy band PrettyMuch
 Bill Porter (1931-2010), famous American audio engineer
Chana Porter, American playwright, novelist, and education activist
 Charles Ethan Porter (c. 1847–1923), African-American still-life painter
 Charles H. Porter (Virginia politician) (1833–1897), US congressman from Virginia
 Charles O. Porter (1919–2006), US congressman from Oregon
 Chilla Porter (1936–2020), Australian high jumper
 Chris Porter (disambiguation)
 Christian Porter (born 1970), Australian politician
 Cole Porter (1891–1964), American composer
 Dana Porter (1901–1967), Canadian politician and jurist
 Darrell Porter (1952–2002), American baseball player
 David Porter (disambiguation)
 Dawn Porter (born 1979), British television presenter and writer
 Denaun Porter (born 1978), American rapper and record producer
 Dorothy Porter (1954–2008), Australian poet
 Edward Guss Porter (1859–1929), Canadian politician
 Edwin Stanton Porter (1870–1941), American filmmaker
 Eleanor H. Porter (1868–1920), author of children's literature
 Elias Porter (1914–1987), American psychologist
 Eliot Porter (1901–1990), American photographer
 Endymion Porter (1587–1649), English royalist
 Eric Porter (1928–1995), English actor
 Fairfield Porter (1907–1975), American painter and art critic
 Fitz John Porter (1822–1901), Union general in the American Civil War
 Fred L. Porter (1877–1938), New York politician

G – L
 Gail Porter (born 1971), British television presenter
 Galen Porter (1807–1883), New York police captain
 Garth Porter (born 1948), Australian musician
 George Porter Jr. (born 1947), American musician
 George Bryan Porter (1791–1834), governor of Michigan Territory
 George R. Porter (1792–1852), British statistician of the nineteenth century
 Gilchrist Porter (1817–1894), US congressman from Missouri
 Gladys Porter (1894–1967), Canadian politician
 Graeme Porter (born 1955), Australian cricketer
 Gregory Porter (born 1971), American jazz vocalist
 Henry Porter (disambiguation)
 Howard Porter (1948–2007), American professional basketball player
 Howard Porter, American comic book artist
 Horace Porter (1837–1921), Union general in the American Civil War and president of the Pullman Palace Car Company
 Hugh Porter (born 1940), British cyclist and sports commentator
 Hugh Porter (Wisconsin politician) (1843–1936), American politician in Wisconsin
 H. V. Porter (died 1975), American educator and athletic administrator
 Jamie Porter (born 1993), English cricketer
 James Porter (disambiguation)
 Jane Porter (1776–1850), Scottish novelist and dramatist
 Janet Porter (born 1962), American conservative activist
 Jay Porter (1933–2020), American baseball player
 Jean Porter (1922–2018), American actress and writer
 Jeff Porter (born 1985), American track and field athlete
 Jeff Porter (politician), American politician from Missouri
 Jerry Porter (American football) (born 1978)
 Jim Porter (born 1949), Australian rugby league footballer
 Joel Porter (born 1978), Australian footballer
 Joey Porter (born 1977), American football player
 John Porter (disambiguation)
 Johnathan Porter (born 1997), American rapper known professionally as Blueface
 Jon Porter (born 1955), American politician
 Jontay Porter (born 1999), American basketball player (also brother of Michael Porter Jr.)
 Jorgie Porter (born 1987), British actress
 Kalan Porter (born 1985), Canadian singer
 Katherine Anne Porter (1890–1980), American writer
 Katie Porter, (born 1974), American Congresswoman from California
 Keith R. Porter (1912–1997), American cell biologist
 Kevin Porter (born 1950), American basketball player
 Kevin Porter Jr. (born 2000), American basketball player
 King G. Porter (1921–2012), American politician
 Kris Porter (born 1978), Canadian ice hockey player
 Kris Porter (basketball) (born 1994), Filipino basketball player
 Kyle Porter (born 1990), Canadian soccer player
 LePreston Porter (1985–2022), American rapper and singer better known professionally as Snootie Wild
 Lewis Porter (born 1951), author, music professor at Rutgers
 Linda Porter (disambiguation)
 Lucy Porter (born 1973), English actress and comedian
 Lucy Wallace Porter (1876–1962), American photographer

M – Z
 Mason Porter (born 1976), American mathematician and professor at UCLA
 Michael Porter (born 1947), American strategic management academic and co-founder of the Monitor Group
 Michael Porter Jr. (born 1998), American basketball player (no relation to the academic)
 Montel Vontavious Porter (born 1973), ring name of American professional wrestler Hassan Assad
 Monty Porter (born 1965), Australian rugby league footballer
 Neal Porter, American children's book editor and publisher
 Nelson D. Porter (1863–1961), mayor of Ottawa, Canada
 Noah Porter (1811–1892), American educator and philosopher
 Nyree Dawn Porter, New Zealand-born actress
 Otto Porter (born 1993), American professional basketball player
 Pat Porter (1959–2012), American long-distance runner and Olympian
 Peter Porter (poet) (1929–2010), Australian-born British poet
 Peter A. Porter (1853–1925), US congressman from New York
 Peter A. Porter (colonel) (1827–1864), Union Army colonel in the American Civil War
 Peter Buell Porter (1773–1844), US Secretary of War and congressman from New York
 Pleasant Porter (1840–1907), American Indian statesman and Principal Chief of the Creek Nation 
 Quincy Porter (1897–1966), American composer
 Quinton Porter (born 1982), American football player
 Ray Porter, American actor
 Robert Porter (disambiguation)
 Rodney Robert Porter (1917–1985), British biochemist
 Rose Porter (1845–1906), American novelist
 Roy Porter (1946–2002), historian of medicine
 Rufus Porter (1792–1884), American painter, inventor, and founder of Scientific American magazine
 Rufus Porter (American football) (born 1965), former professional American football linebacker in the National Football League
 Russell W. Porter (1871–1949), American co-founder of the Amateur Telescope Makers movement
 Scott Porter (born 1979), American actor
 Shirley Porter (born 1930), British politician
 Silas Wright Porter (1857–1937), Associate Justice of the Kansas Supreme Court
 Stephen Geyer Porter (1869–1930), US congressman from Pennsylvania
 Susie Porter (born 1970 or 1971), Australian television and film actress
 Sylvia Porter (1913–1991), American financial columnist
 Terry Porter (born 1963), American professional basketball player and coach
 Theodore M. Porter (born 1954), American historian of science
 Thomas Conrad Porter (1822–1901), American botanist and theologian
 Timothy H. Porter (1785–1845), US congressman from New York
 Todd Porter (disambiguation)
 Tony Porter (born 1952), British Bishop of Sherwood
 Tracy Porter (born 1986), American professional football player
 Una Porter (1900-1996), Australian psychiatrist and philanthropist
 Whitworth Porter (1827–1892), an English Major General.
 William A. Porter (1928–2015), American founder of E*Trade financial services company
 William Sydney Porter (1862–1910), the writer O. Henry
 William T. Porter (1809–1858), American newspaper journalist and editor
 William Townsend Porter (1862–1949), American physician, physiologist, and medical educator
 Willy Porter, contemporary American folk musician

Given name

 Porter Blanchard (1886–1973), American silversmith
 Porter Cottrell (born 1962), American bodybuilder
 Porter H. Dale (1867–1933), US congressman and senator from Vermont
 Porter Goss (born 1938), CIA director and US congressman from Florida
 Porter Gustin (born 1997), American football player
 Porter Hall (1888–1953), American film and stage actor
 Porter King (1857–1901), American politician from Alabama and Georgia
 Porter Lainhart (1907–1991), American football player
 Porter J. McCumber (1858–1933), US senator from North Dakota
 Porter Moser (born 1968), American basketball coach
 Porter Robinson (born 1992), American producer and DJ
 Porter Rockwell (1813 or 1815–1878), American gunfighter, deputy United States Marshal and Mormon leadership bodyguard
 Porter Wagoner (1927–2007), American country music singer

References

See also

English-language surnames
English masculine given names
Masculine given names
Occupational surnames
English-language occupational surnames

de:Porter
es:Porter
fr:Porter
nl:Porter
ja:ポーター
ru:Портер (значения)
simple:Porter